Jimmi Madsen (born 4 January 1969) is a Danish former cyclist who raced professionally from 1993 to 2004. He rode for Denmark on the track in four Olympic Games: 1988, 1992, 1996 and 2000.  He won the bronze medal in the Men's team pursuit in the 1992 Summer Olympics. Madsen was also part of the Danish squad that took the bronze in the team pursuit at the 1993 UCI Track Cycling World Championships. He was a three-time European track champion, winning the European madison title in 1996 and 1997 alongside Jens Veggerby, and a European Derny championship in 2000. Madsen also won ten six-day races during his career.

References 

1969 births
Living people
Cyclists at the 1988 Summer Olympics
Cyclists at the 1992 Summer Olympics
Cyclists at the 1996 Summer Olympics
Cyclists at the 2000 Summer Olympics
Danish male cyclists
Olympic bronze medalists for Denmark
Olympic cyclists of Denmark
Olympic medalists in cycling
Cyclists from Copenhagen
Medalists at the 1992 Summer Olympics